Neoconocephalus velox, the swift conehead, is a species of conehead in the family Tettigoniidae.  It is found in North America.

References

Further reading

 
 

velox
Insects described in 1914